Veeram is a 2014 Indian Tamil-language action drama film directed by Siva and produced by Vijaya Productions. The film stars Ajith Kumar and Tamannaah, with a supporting cast including Vidharth, Bala, Santhanam, Nassar, Pradeep Rawat and Atul Kulkarni. Pre-production works had been ongoing since December 2011, with shooting starting in April 2013. The film was released on 10 January 2014. The film received  positive reviews from critics and became successful at box-office. The film was remade in Telugu as Katamarayudu (2017), and in Kannada as Odeya.

Plot
Vinayagam is a brave person who lives with his four brothers Murughan, Shanmugham, Kumaaran and Shenthil in the village of Oddanchatram. They are often caught in fights, where Advocate "Bail" Perumaal bails them out whenever legal issues arise because of their brawls. Vinayagam hates the idea of marriage as he feels that his wife might create disharmony among brothers. Though the four younger brothers pretend they don't want to get married, they all have secret lovers. 

The brothers learn through Vinayagam's childhood friend Collector Subbu that Vinayagam, in his school days, was in love with a girl named Koppuram Devi (fondly called Koppu) and his brothers scheme to find her and reintroduce her to Vinayagam, to rekindle their relationship, but later finds that she is married now and has kids. The brothers conspire to find another woman named Koppuram Devi, because Vinayagam was not in love with that girl so much as her name, and when he meets another girl with that name, he is sure to lose his heart to her, just because she bears that name. Though initially reluctant later, Vinayagam himself falls in love with her. 

Vinayagam clashes with a goon called Vanangamudi to take care of market in the village. Vanangamudi tries to kill Vinayagam's brothers while Vinayagam kidnaps Vanangamudi's son. After clashing, Vinayagam banishes Vanangamudi from the village. While travelling in train to Koppu's village, Koppu narrates her family background to Vinayagam. Koppu's father Nallasivam was a respected man in the village who hated violence, while his son was exact opposite who killed people, but when he was killed, Nallasivam refused to bury him and decided to make his village with peace and harmony. Later, few goons enter into the train, but Vinayagam bashes all the goons, Koppu is shocked to see Vinayagam whom she thought as a non-violent person, where she leaves for her village and tells Vinayagam to never see her again. 

Vinayagam and his brothers arrive at Koppu's village with clean shaven look he reveals to Koppu that he has changed and he would never harbor violence again, He and his brothers are welcomed and respected by her family. Vinayagam is touched and impressed by their love, affection and hospitality. Vinayagam discovers that a goon named Aadalarasu wants to kill Nallasivam and his family, Vinayagam confronts Aadalarasu in the Central Jail for the reason, where he learns that Aadalarasu's father Aavudaiyapan was responsible for the blast of matchstick factory. Nallasivam complained against Aavudaiyappan, who got later arrested and killed himself by jumping in front of a lorry from a police van. Aadalarasu witnessed his father's death and swore revenge against Nallasivam.

Vinayagam challenges Aadalarasu that he will protect Nallasivam's family, where he finishes all the goons and solves all their problems without the knowledge of Nallasivam and family. When Nallasivam's granddaughter finds aruval under Vinayagam's jeep, Nallasivam orders Vinayagam to leave the town. Aadalarasu, who escapes from death penalty arrives to kill Nallasivam, but Vinayagam keeps him and his family in a safe place. Aadalarasu informs Vinayagam that he had kidnapped Kumaran, Vinayagam arrives at the nick of time and saves his brother but instead gets attacked by Aadalarasu. Nallasivam and his family who arrives at the place realise the risk taken by Vinayagam to save the family. Though brutally attacked, Vinayagam rises steadily where he kills Aadalarasu and his henchmen. Nallasivam, who is impressed with Vinayagam's valour gets Vinayagam and Koppu married. Thus, Vinayagam and his brothers get married with great pomp.

Cast

 Ajith Kumar as Vinayagam
 Tamannaah as Koperundevi.Jr Vinayagam's love interest
 Vidharth as Shanmugam, Vinayagam's brother
 Bala as Murugan, Vinayagam's brother
 Santhanam as Bail Perumal
 Nassar as Nallasivam
 Pradeep Rawat as Vanangamudi
 Atul Kulkarni as Aadalarasu
 Avinash as Aavudaiyappan (flashback)
 Munish as Senthil
 Suhail Chandhok as Kumaran
 Thambi Ramaiya as Savarimuthu
 Appukutty as Mayilvaganam
 Ramesh Khanna as District Collector Subbu
 Ilavarasu as Azhagappan
 Mayilsamy as Marikolunthu
 Shanmugarajan as Police Officer
 Amit Kumar Tiwari as Vanangamudi's son
 Abhinaya as Poongothai
 Manochitra as Anita
 Suza Kumar as Senbagam
 Vidyullekha Raman as Alamelu
 Rohini Hattangadi as Sr. Koppuram Devi
 Devadarshini as District Collector Subbu's wife
 Sumithra
 Kalairani
 Stunt Silva as Henchman
 Crane Manohar as College peon
 Paravai Muniyamma
 Yuvina Parthavi as Nallasivam's granddaughter
 Pawan as Nallasivam's son
 Periyardasan as Bhai
 R. N. R. Manohar as Maanikkam
 Sujatha Sivakumar as Nallasivam's younger sister
 Ashmitha Subramaniyam as Savarimuthu's daughter
 Sreeja Ravi as Teacher
 Yogi Babu as Henchman
 Japan Kumar as Gurka henchman
 Mippu
 Vazhakku En Muthuraman
 Hello Kandasamy as Worker

Production

Development
The potential collaboration between Vijaya Productions and *Ajith Kumar was reported in November 2011, with speculation suggesting that Venkata Ramana Reddy wanted to commemorate his late father B. Nagi Reddy's 100th year since birth with a film project. Siva, who had made his debut in Tamil films with the 2011 film Siruthai, was noted as a potential candidate to direct the film, while Anushka Shetty was initially reported to play the female lead role. Subsequently, in early December 2011, Ajith signed on to play the lead role in the venture, with a poster released confirming Siva's participation, noting that Vetri and Yuvan Shankar Raja would be cinematographer and music composer, respectively.

Casting
Alongside Ajith, it was noted that four young actors would appear as his brothers in the venture. Vidharth, who rose to fame with his role in Mynaa, was signed on for the film after discussions with Prasanna was unsuccessful. Suhail Chandhok, brother of former Formula One racer Karun Chandhok, was signed on for a role after Ajith was impressed with a short film that Suhail had featured in. Munish, who appeared in Naanga, and Bala, director Siva's brother, were also selected to play Ajith's brothers. Santhanam, who featured in a pivotal role in Siva's previous film, was also chosen to play a supporting role in the film. Tamannaah was chosen to play Ajith's pair in the film, marking her comeback to Tamil films after a three-year sabbatical. Vishakha Singh was approached to play Vidharth's pair in the film but her refusal subsequently meant the producers opted for Manochitra, who was previously seen in Aval Peyar Thamizharasi (2010), while Abhinaya signed for another lead role. Vidyullekha Raman signed to be Santhanam's pair for a third film. Jayaprakash, Jayaram and Rajeev Govinda Pillai were also initially reported to be a part of the cast, though a later press release did not confirm their participation. Kannada actor Avinash agreed to play a character "who, due to poverty, has become vengeful and is willing to do anything wrong for his own benefit".

Bhoopathi Raja has written the script along with Siva and Bharathan has written the dialogues.

Filming

A press note was released on 4 April 2013 announcing the start of the filming of the project, while also clarifying the cast and crew. The first schedule for the film began the next day in Hyderabad and went on for two weeks and more. The film was initially rumoured to be titled as Vetri Kondaan or Vinayagam Brothers before finally confirming Veeram. The shoot was completed on 2 November 2013.

Ajith had participated in a stunt sequence where he had to hang outside the train. The sequence was shot in a location situated in the Orissa border.

Themes and influences
The film's plot is about a brave person and his four younger brothers who are living in a village. Sudhish Kamath of The Hindu noted that the scenes were inspired from films like Murattu Kaalai (1980), Annamalai (1992) and Baashha (1995).

Soundtrack

The film's soundtrack was composed by Devi Sri Prasad. The music rights were purchased by Junglee Music. The album, consisting of 5 tracks, was scheduled to be released on 20 December 2013 but the tracks leaked on the Internet on 18 December 2013. The music was officially launched on 20 December followed by airplay of the songs on FM stations. Behindwoods gave the soundtrack a rating of 2.75 out of 5 and India Glitz gave 2.5.

Release
The satellite rights of the film were purchased by Sun TV. Central Board of Film Certification gave the film "U" certificate.

The film was released in 400 screens in Tamil Nadu, 120 screens in Kerala, 50 screens in Karnataka, and in 220 screens overseas.

A first-look teaser was released on 7 Novem ber 2013. The second teaser was released on 5 December 2013 with a dialogue "Enna Naan Solrathu". Veerams trailer was released by Sun TV as a New Year special at 10 am.

Distribution
Across Tamil Nadu, Veeram was distributed by various parties: in Chennai City by Sri Thenandal Films, in NSC area by Sri Thenandal Films, in T.T (Trichy and Thanjavur) by Green Screens, in M.R (Madurai, Ramanadhapuram) are by Gopuram Films and in T. K. (Thirunelveli, Kanyakumari) are by Sri Mookambiga Films. Vendhar Movies released the film in Coimbatore and surroundings through Vel Films and in Salem and surroundings through G Film.

Reception

Critical reception
The film received positive reviews from critics.

The Times of India gave 3 out of 5 stars and wrote, "The film is a template masala film – a superhuman hero, his cronies who will sing his praises all the time, a beautiful-looking heroine, a raging villain. It has no room for logic, moving from one hero-worshipping scene to the next and is aimed at our visceral tastes. The story is in service of its star and, it is unapologetic about it". Rediff gave 2.5 stars out of 5 and stated, "Veeram is a treat for Ajith fans". Sify gave 4 stars out of 5 calling it a "Mass Entertainer" and writing, "The film works mainly due to Ajith's charisma and Siva's script. It is a formula film where essential masala has been correctly mixed in the right proposition. On the whole, Veeram is an enjoyable fun ride". Baradwaj Rangan wrote, "A family with five brothers, another family with representatives from three generations, annan-thambi sentiment, amma sentiment, appa sentiment, and in the middle of all this, a big star giving his fans what they want – if Faazil and Vikraman collaborated on a 'mass' masala movie, it might end up looking like Siva's Veeram. Veeram is about the hero. Everything else – the crude dramatics, the piles of clichés, the characters (especially the bad guys) who come and go as they please – is secondary". Bangalore Mirror gave 3.5 out of 5 and called it "a festival cracker for the fans of Thala".

OneIndia rated the film 3.5 out of 5 and said "Veeram is such an entertaining movie where audience will hardly find drawbacks. The entertainment quotient is very high and it could be enjoyed by all section of audience. Ajith has a winner in hand again". Indiaglitz gave 3.25 out of 5 and wrote, "Siruthai Siva comes up with a story that is not out of the box, however a racy screenplay and Thala's immense presence and valor takes the ball out of the boundary". Behindwoods rated it 2.75 out of 5 and said "Ajith and Siva dish out a 'heady' commercial package for the actor's fans". Deccan Herald wrote, "Tiresomely long, with second half, tad sagging, Veeram has Thala Ajith in fulsome flow with all fireworks. While Ajith's fans may swoon and swear by his one-man demolition squad show that will give even hulk Arnold Schwarzenegger the blushes, for the rest though, it's a matinee masala to stay away". IANS gave 2.5 stars out of 5 and wrote, "Veeram is a classic example, which elevates Ajith and leaves the rest of the ensemble cast behind. The film is dedicated to Ajith, who is as charismatic as ever in his role. However, he is unfortunately not complemented by a strong screenplay".

Box office
India

After its first week, Veeram grossed ca.  worldwide.

Awards and nominations

Remakes 
Veeram was remade in Telugu as Katamarayudu  and it was released in 2017. The film was also remade in Kannada as Odeya and it was released on 2019. In 2022, the movie was remade in Hindi as Kisi Ka Bhai Kisi Ki Jaan.

References

External links
 

2014 action comedy films
2014 films
2010s Tamil-language films
Films scored by Devi Sri Prasad
Films directed by Siva (director)
2014 masala films
Tamil films remade in other languages
Indian action comedy films
Films shot in Tamil Nadu
Films shot in Switzerland